The Rockland Branch is a railroad from Brunswick, Maine to Rockland, Maine.  A charter was granted in 1849 to build a railway from the Portland and Kennebec Railroad on the west side of the Kennebec River to Rockland.  Construction through the rocky headlands of the Atlantic coast proved more expensive than anticipated.  The Knox and Lincoln Railroad commenced service to Rockland in 1871 using a ferry to cross the Kennebec River between Bath and Woolwich.  The Knox and Lincoln was leased by Maine Central Railroad in 1891, and became Maine Central's Rockland Branch in 1901.  Maine Central purchased the Samoset destination hotel in nearby Glen Cove (a part of neighbouring Rockport) in 1912, and offered direct passenger service for summer visitors from the large eastern cities.  Carlton bridge was completed in 1927 to carry the railroad and U.S. Route 1 over the Kennebec River.  Maine Central sold the Samoset hotel in 1941, and the last Maine Central passenger train to Rockland was on 4 April 1959.  The State of Maine purchased the branch in 1987 to prevent abandonment.  The line has subsequently been operated by the Maine Coast Railroad, the Maine Eastern Railroad, and, beginning in 2016, the Central Maine and Quebec Railway. In 2019, Canadian Pacific Railway agreed to purchase the Central Maine and Quebec, thereby inheriting the operation of the Rockland Branch. The acquisition was completed on June 3, 2020.

Route mileposts

Milepost 0: Brunswick junction with Maine Central Lower Road and Lewiston Branch

Milepost 8.7: Bath with Bath Iron Works shipyard

Milepost 9.5: Woolwich

Milepost 20: Wiscasset interchange with narrow-gauge Wiscasset, Waterville and Farmington Railway from 1895 to 1933

Milepost 27.1: Newcastle

Milepost 28.9: Damariscotta Mills

Milepost 31.7: Nobleboro

Milepost 38.5: Waldoboro

Milepost 45.3: Warren

Milepost 52.4: Thomaston large cement plant

Milepost 56.6: Rockland ferry connections to Penobscot Bay

References

Maine Eastern Railroad
Maine Central Railroad
Canadian Pacific Railway lines in the United States
Rail infrastructure in Maine
Brunswick, Maine
Rockland, Maine